Child protection, child welfare, or youth protection may refer to:
Child protection
Aboriginal child protection
Safeguarding

 Laws
 Adam Walsh Child Protection and Safety Act, a 2006 United States law that created the national sex offender registry
 Child Protection and Obscenity Enforcement Act, a 1988 United States law concerning record-keeping requirements for sexually explicit materials
 Child Protection Registry Acts, state laws creating children's do not call registries
 Child Online Protection Act, a 1998 law restricting what information online entities can collect about children

 Government agencies
 Child Protective Services, US government agencies charged with child protection
 Ministry of Youth Protection and Rehabilitation (Quebec)
 Norwegian Child Welfare Services

 Organizations
 Office of Child and Youth Protection, the Catholic church's child protection organization
 Youth Protection program (Boy Scouts of America)

Other
 Child Welfare (journal), a journal published by the Child Welfare League of America